Medius brassi is a moth of the family Erebidae first described by Michael Fibiger in 2011. It is found in Nepal (it was described from the Kathmandu Valley).

The wingspan is about 13 mm. The forewings are broad and long, with a pointed apex. The ground colour is brown, with dark-brown patches at the base of the costa, in the upper quadrangular medial and terminal areas. The hindwing ground colour is grey brown, with a discal spot.

References

Micronoctuini
Taxa named by Michael Fibiger
Moths described in 2011